Elvy Sukaesih (born June 25, 1951 in Jakarta) is one of the most popular dangdut singers in Indonesia, and has been dubbed the Queen of Dangdut. Sukaesih has a significant fan base in other Asian countries such as Japan.  She has been a prolific recording artist since the late 1960s.

Discography
Albums
Raja Dan Ratu - Rhoma Irama and Elvy Sukaesih 1975
Pesta Panen, 1990
The Return of Diva, 1992

Contributing artist
 The Rough Guide to the Music of Indonesia (2000, World Music Network)

References

Further reading
The Rough Guide To The Music Of Indonesia
The Far Eastern Audio Review (Web site)
Lonely Planet Theme Guide, Dangdut, Indonesia
Weintraub, Andrew N. 2010. Dangdut Stories: a social and musical history of Indonesia’s most popular music. Oxford University Press.   (hardback)   (paperback)

External links
 Profile  In Indonesian

1951 births
Living people
Indonesian dangdut singers
20th-century Indonesian women singers
Anugerah Musik Indonesia winners
Place of birth missing (living people)